6-Ketoprogesterone is an orally active oxidized form of progesterone that contains a keto group at position-6.

References

Further reading

Pregnanes